Marko Dinjar (born 21 May 1986) is a Croatian football midfielder who currently plays for NK Vardarac. He also appeared for the Croatian national team at various youth levels.

Club career
Dinjar started his career playing at youth level for his hometown club Osijek. He made his professional league debut in the 2002–03 Prva HNL season as a second-half substitute in an away match against Varteks on 10 August 2002. This made him the youngest debutant in the history of the league, at the age of 16 years and 82 days (5926 days), a record he held until March 2013 when Cibalia's Marko Dabro played in a match against RNK Split at the age of 16 years and 2 days.

In March 2008, Dinjar signed a four-year contract with Russian club Terek Grozny. In the summer of 2009, he joined Hungarian club Győri ETO.

References

External links

Marko Dinjar at HLSZ 

1986 births
Living people
Footballers from Osijek
Association football midfielders
Croatian footballers
Croatia youth international footballers
Croatia under-21 international footballers
NK Osijek players
FC Akhmat Grozny players
Győri ETO FC players
Puskás Akadémia FC players
Puskás Akadémia FC II players
Kozármisleny SE footballers
Mezőkövesdi SE footballers
Szeged 2011 players
Croatian Football League players
Russian Premier League players
Nemzeti Bajnokság I players
Croatian expatriate footballers
Expatriate footballers in Russia
Croatian expatriate sportspeople in Russia
Expatriate footballers in Hungary
Croatian expatriate sportspeople in Hungary